Hans-Joachim Pochstein (30 October 1952 – 5 June 1991) was a German football forward.

References

External links
 

1952 births
1991 deaths
German footballers
Bundesliga players
VfL Bochum players
Association football forwards